Julio Ramón Menchaca Salazar (born 27 December 1959) is a Mexican politician affiliated with the National Regeneration Movement and the current Governor of Hidalgo. He previously served as deputy and senator for Hidalgo.

References

1959 births
Living people
20th-century Mexican politicians
21st-century Mexican politicians
Governors of Hidalgo (state)
Institutional Revolutionary Party politicians
Members of the Chamber of Deputies (Mexico)
Members of the Senate of the Republic (Mexico)
Morena (political party) politicians
Politicians from Hidalgo (state)
Senators of the LXIV and LXV Legislatures of Mexico